This is a list of public and private and university libraries in Rhode Island, USA.

External links

Ocean State Libraries

Libraries
Rhode Island
Libraries
Libraries in Rhode Island
Brown University-related lists